Cummingsoceras is a genus of barrandeoceroids within the Tarphycerida, included in the family Uranoceratidae.  Its shell is a rapidly expanding gyrocone of about 1.5 narrowly separated whorls.

The surface is faintly cancellated by slight longitudinal lines that cross growth lines which define a deep hyponmic sinus.  The siphuncle is small, subcentral, and with recumbent necks.

Cummingsoceras is known from the middle Silurian of Indiana and Illinois.

References

 Sweet, Walter C. 1964. Nautiloidea-Barrandeocerida. Treatise on Invertebrate Paleontology, Part K. Geol Soc of America and Univ Kansas Press.

Prehistoric nautiloid genera